Thomas H. Brown (July 29, 1917 - August 24, 2002) was a Democratic politician who served in the Michigan House of Representatives and as the first mayor of Westland, Michigan.

A native of Indiana, Brown moved to Michigan and served in several elected offices in Nankin Township before the township was incorporated as the City of Westland. He was elected its first mayor.

In 1970, Brown was elected to the first of six terms in the House, where he chaired the chamber's Towns and Counties Committee.

Brown was member of the Lions, the Knights of Columbus, Amvets, and the Veterans of Foreign Wars. He was a delegate to the 1968 Democratic National Convention in Chicago which nominated Hubert H. Humphrey for President of the United States.

Brown died of cancer on August 24, 2002, aged 85.

References

Democratic Party members of the Michigan House of Representatives
1917 births
2002 deaths
Mayors of places in Michigan
Deaths from cancer in Michigan
20th-century American politicians